Río Campo is a town in Litoral, Equatorial Guinea. It has a population of 1,105 (2005 est.). The town is located inside the Rio Campo Natural Reserve and on the border of Cameroon.

Religion 
The principal religion in Equatorial Guinea is Christianity which is the faith of 93% of the population. Rio Campo has mostly indigenous beliefs due to its remoteness. These are predominantly Roman Catholic (87%) while a minority are Protestants (5%). Another 5% of the population follow indigenous beliefs and the final 2% comprises Muslims, Bahá'í Faith, and other beliefs.

Culture and language 
The town has a variety of both European and African languages. Official languages are Spanish, French and Portuguese. Some recognized languages are Fang, Bube, Annobonese. For culture see Culture of Equatorial Guinea.

Physical geography 
Río Campo sits 125 feet above sea level. The nearest large open bodies of water are the Gulf of Guinea and the Atlantic Ocean. The small town borders the country of Cameroon to the east. To the east there is a river that runs from the town Yenge and drains into the Atlantic Ocean.

Wildlife 
Rio Campo is home to many different and unique animal and plant species. There has been much pressure on the reserve itself for not taking better care of the land and animals.

Climate 
Río Campo is situated in a rain forest. It rains for the greater part of the year. Río Campo is relatively hot all year round.

Populated places in Litoral (Equatorial Guinea)